Prêmio Al Rio (Al Rio Award) was a Brazilian award to honor Brazilian comic book artists with prominence in the national and international comics industry. The name was a tribute to the cartoonist of the same name. The laureate artists received trophies of revelation and of regional, national and international prominence.

The award was associated with GeekExpo, then the main geek event in Ceará, whose first edition took place in 2015. Trophies for Al Rio winners were handed out during the event. The last edition of the award took place in 2018, when happened also the last edition of GeekExpo, which was "absorbed" by the Sana Fest event this year.

Winners 

2015
 Revelation: Sirlanney
 Regional Prominence: Mino
 National Prominence: Adão Iturrusgarai
 International Prominence: Cris Peter

2016
 Revelation: Talles Rodrigues
 Regional Prominence: Daniel Brandão
 National Prominence: Lu Cafaggi
 International Prominence: Ed Benes

2017
 Revelation: Blenda Furtado
 Regional Prominence: Geraldo Jesuíno
 National Prominence: Vitor Cafaggi
 International Prominence: Geraldo Borges

2018
 Revelation: Ise Nishi
 Regional Prominence: JJ Marreiro
 National Prominence: Fabio Coala
 International Prominence: Dijjo Lima

References 

Comics awards in Brazil